Chalo Trust School is a Secondary and Primary Christian, Boarding, Co-education school, that is located in Lusaka, Zambia. Chalo Trust School was founded by Mr. and Mrs. Chileshe. The Chileshes came to Chamba Valley in 1995, originally using the land for poultry and vegetable farming. In January 2004, the school opened its secondary education section to the public with the name “Chalo” in recognition of children, Chali and Lombe Chileshe.

References

Boarding schools in Zambia